Madison Township is one of the fifteen townships of Pickaway County, Ohio, United States.  The 2000 census found 1,461 people in the township.

Geography
Located in the northeastern corner of the county, it borders the following townships:
Madison Township, Franklin County - north
Bloom Township, Fairfield County - east
Amanda Township, Fairfield County - southeast corner
Walnut Township - south
Harrison Township - west
Hamilton Township, Franklin County - northwest corner

No municipalities are located in Madison Township.

Slate Run, a tributary to the Scioto River, runs through Madison Township. The township is home to the 1,705-acre Slate Run Metro Park.

Name and history
It is one of twenty Madison Townships statewide.

Government
The township is governed by a three-member board of trustees, who are elected in November of odd-numbered years to a four-year term beginning on the following January 1. Two are elected in the year after the presidential election and one is elected in the year before it. There is also an elected township fiscal officer, who serves a four-year term beginning on April 1 of the year after the election, which is held in November of the year before the presidential election. Vacancies in the fiscal officership or on the board of trustees are filled by the remaining trustees.

References

External links
County website

Townships in Pickaway County, Ohio
Townships in Ohio